The Multi-Vendor Integration Protocol (MVIP) is a hardware bus for computer telephony integration (Audiotex) equipment, a PCM data highway for interconnecting expansion boards inside a PC. It was invented and brought to market by Natural Microsystems Inc (now BPQ Communicationser).

Used to build call center equipment using regular PCs, MVIP provides a second communications bus within the computer that can multiplex up to 256 full-duplex voice channels from one voice card to another. Digital voice, fax and video is bussed over a ribbon cable connected at the top of each ISA or PCI card. MVIP products make a PC perform like a small-scale PBX. The protocol accommodated for a variety of expansion boards, including trunk interfaces (usually T1 or ISDN), voice processing boards equipment  speech recognition or fax processing. Each board could optionally provide a switch that could interconnect voice channels on the bus, allowing for a flexible routing of calls within the MVIP bus.

The MVIP bus was promoted as an alternative to the then-dominant PEB bus by Dialogic Corporation which had much less capacity and was not an open standard.

References

External links
http://www.mvip.org/ 
http://www.mvip.org/Overview.htm 

Computer buses
Computer telephony integration